Dieci canzoni d'amore da salvare (English title: "Ten Love Songs") is a 1953 Italian film directed by Flavio Calzavara. The plot concerns a songwriter, played by Jacques Sernas who leaves his sweetheart and publisher when he learns that he is going blind. Supporting Sernas were Brunella Bovo, Franca Tamantini, and Enrico Viarisio.

References

1953 films
1953 musical films
Italian musical films
Italian black-and-white films
1950s Italian films
1950s Italian-language films